Una Katherine Wickham (12 January 1923 – 20 June 1983) was a New Zealand cricketer who played as a right-handed batter and right-arm medium bowler. She appeared in two Test matches for New Zealand in 1948 and 1949, scoring 40 runs and taking three wickets. She played domestic cricket for Auckland.

References

External links
 
 

1923 births
1983 deaths
Sportspeople from Tauranga
New Zealand women cricketers
New Zealand women Test cricketers
Auckland Hearts cricketers